The WNBA Playoffs is an elimination tournament between 8 teams in the Women's National Basketball Association (WNBA), ultimately deciding the final two teams who will play in the WNBA Finals.

Current format
Following the WNBA regular season, eight teams in the entire league qualify for the playoffs and are seeded one to eight.

Regular season records determine the seedings of the teams. The team with the best record receives seed one, the team with the next best record receives seed two, and so on. These seedings are used to create a bracket that determines the matchups throughout the playoffs. The 2022 season saw the playoffs return to a standard eight-team bracket for the first time since 2015, though in a slightly different format.

The first round consists of best-of-three series, with one side of the bracket featuring 1–8 and 4–5 pairings and the other featuring 2–7 and 3–6 pairings. Differences between the current first-round format and the one abandoned after 2015 are:
 The 2015 format featured separate brackets for each conference. The 2022 format maintains the league's recent practice of ignoring conference affiliation for playoff qualifying purposes.
 Series in the 2015 format featured a 1–1–1 home-court pattern, with the higher seed hosting game 1 and (if necessary) game 3, and the lower seed hosting game 2. The home-court pattern in the 2022 format is 2–1, with the higher seed hosting the first two games. This in turn means that the higher seed can win the series without having to visit the lower seed, though the lower seed will host the series decider if it wins one of the first two games.

In the current format, the playoff bracket is not reseeded after the first round.

The semifinals and WNBA Finals are best-of-five series played in a 2-2-1 format, meaning the team with home-court advantage (better record) hosts games 1, 2, and 5 while their opponent hosts games 3 and 4.

The 2022 format replaced a format used from 2016 to 2021 in which all playoff games before the semifinals were single-elimination and played on the home court of the higher seed. The first round consisted of two matchups based on the seedings (5–8 and 6–7). The two winners advanced to the second round with a matchup between the number 3 seed and the lower of the advancing seeds and another matchup between the number 4 seed and the other first-round winner. The winners of the first two rounds advanced to the semifinals, where the lower-ranked seed of the winners faced the number 1 seed, while the other remaining team faced the number 2 seed.

Tiebreak procedures
 Better winning percentage among all head-to-head games involving tied teams.
 Better winning percentage against all teams with a .500 or better record at the end of the season.
 Better point differential in games involving tied teams.
 Better point differential in all games.
 Coin toss (or draw of lots, if at least 3 teams are still tied after the first 4 tiebreakers fail).

Playoff series history

2021 season

2020 season

2019 season

2018 season

2017 season

2016 season

2015 season

2014 season

There were 12 teams in the league. For the playoffs, the four teams with the best record in each conference were seeded one to four.

2013 season

There were 12 teams in the league. For the playoffs, the four teams with the best record in each conference were seeded one to four.

2012 season

There were 12 teams in the league. For the playoffs, the four teams with the best record in each conference were seeded one to four.

2011 season

There were 12 teams in the league. For the playoffs, the four teams with the best record in each conference were seeded one to four.

2010 season

There are 12 teams in the league. For the playoffs, the four teams with the best record in each conference are seeded one to four.  Starting in 2010, the first two rounds changed to a 1-1-1 format, with the higher-seeded team hosting games 1 & 3.

2009 season

There are 13 teams in the league. For the playoffs, the four teams with the best record in each conference are seeded one to four.

2008 season

There were 14 teams in the league. For the playoffs, the four teams with the best record in each conference were seeded one to four.

2007 season

There were 13 teams in the league. For the playoffs, the four teams with the best record in each conference were seeded one to four.

2006 season

There were 14 teams in the league. For the playoffs, the four teams with the best record in each conference were seeded one to four.

2005 season

There were 13 teams in the league. For the playoffs, the four teams with the best record in each conference were seeded one to four.

2004 season

There were 13 teams in the league. For the playoffs, the four teams with the best record in each conference were seeded one to four.

2003 season

There were 14 teams in the league. For the playoffs, the four teams with the best record in each conference were seeded one to four.

2002 season

There were 16 teams in the league. For the playoffs, the four teams with the best record in each conference were seeded one to four.

2001 season

There were 16 teams in the league. For the playoffs, the four teams with the best record in each conference were seeded one to four.

2000 season

There were 16 teams in the league. For the playoffs, the four teams with the best record in each conference were seeded one to four.

1999 season

There were 12 teams in the league. For the playoffs, the three teams with the best record in each conference were seeded one to three. The top seeded team in each conference got a bye for the first round.

1998 season

There were 10 teams in the league. For the playoffs, the four teams with the best record in the league were seeded one to four. Houston was switched to the Western Conference in 1998 so two Western Conference teams matched up in the WNBA Finals.

1997 season

This was the first year of existence for the WNBA. There were only 8 teams in the league. For the playoffs, the four teams with the best record in the league were seeded one to four. Houston was in the Eastern Conference in 1997 so two Eastern Conference teams matched up in the WNBA Championship.

See also
Women's National Basketball Association
WNBA Finals

References

External links
 WNBA Playoff History